Sergey Betov and Alexander Bury were the defending champions, but Betov did not participate this year. Bury partnered with Andreas Siljeström, but lost the final against Fabrice Martin and Purav Raja, 6–7(5–7), 6–4, [16–18].

Seeds

Draw

External links
 Main Draw

Tilia Slovenia Open - Doubles
2015 Doubles